Metrication in Australia effectively began in 1966 with the conversion to decimal currency under the auspices of the Decimal Currency Board. The conversion of measurements—metrication—commenced subsequently in 1971, under the direction of the Metric Conversion Board and actively proceeded until the Board was disbanded in 1981.

Before 1970, Australia mostly used imperial units, inherited from the United Kingdom. Between 1970 and 1988, imperial units were withdrawn from general legal use and replaced with the International System of Units, facilitated through legislation and government agencies. SI units are now the only legal units of measurement in Australia. Australia's largely successful transition to the metric system parallels that of metrication in New Zealand but contrasts with metrication in the United States and metrication in the United Kingdom.

History
Although there was debate in Australia's first Parliament after federation to consider adopting the metric system, metric units first became legal for use in Australia in 1947 when Australia signed the Metre Convention (or Convention du Mètre). However, Imperial "Weights and Measures" were most commonly used until the Commonwealth government began the metric changeover in the 1970s. In 1960, SI units were adopted as a worldwide system of measurement by international agreement at the General Conference on Weights and Measures. The metre, kilogram, second, ampere, kelvin, candela, and mole were defined as base units in this system and units formed from combinations of these base units were known as "derived units". SI units were subsequently adopted as the basis for Australia's measurement standards, whereby they were defined as Australia's legal units of measurement.

In 1968, a Select Committee of the Australian Senate chaired by Keith Laught examined metric "Weights and Measures" and came to the unanimous conclusion that it was both practical and desirable for Australia to change to the metric system. Some of their considerations included the "inherent advantages of the metric system" that meant that weighing and measuring was facilitated, "often with substantial increases in efficiency". Educationally, the reform would "simplify and unify the teaching of mathematics and science, reduce errors, save teaching time and give a better understanding of basic physical principles". In 1968, more than 75% of Australia's exports went to metric countries, and at that time it was noted that all countries (except the United States) were metric or were converting to the metric system. It was also noted that because of Australia's large migrant program, more than 10 per cent of people over 16 years of age had used the metric system before coming to Australia. They also noted that school pupils were widely familiar with the metric system because it had been taught in the schools for many years.

By 1968, metrication was already well under way in Australian industry. The pharmaceutical industry had metricated in 1965, and much of the chemical and electronics industries worked in metric units, as there were no "Imperial" units for the latter. One of the country's major automobile manufacturers had already declared its intention to metricate before the Government announced its decision to change to the metric system. "The change itself provided a unique opportunity to rationalise and modernise industrial practices and bring Australia's technical standard specifications into accord with those adopted internationally".

On 12 June 1970, the Australian Metric Conversion Act passed by the Australian Parliament was given assent. This Act created the Metric Conversion Board to facilitate the conversion of measurements from imperial to metric. A timeline of major developments in this conversion process is as follows:

1971 – the Australian wool industry converted to the metric system.
1972 –  Horse racing converted in August and air temperatures were converted in September.
1973 – all primary schools were teaching the metric system alone: many had been teaching both imperial and metric for some years. All secondary schools were now using the metric system.
1974 – large scale conversion across industries, including packaged grains, dairy products, eggs, building, timber, paper, printing, meteorological services, postal services, communications, road transport, travel, textiles, gas, electricity, surveying, sport, water supply, mining, metallurgy, chemicals, petroleum, and automotive services. Most beverages, aside from spirits, also converted to metric units by the end of the year. The conversion of road signs took place in July. There was a publicity campaign to prepare the public.
1976 – the building and construction industry completed its change to metric measurements (within two years) by January.
1977 – all packaged goods were labelled in metric units, and the air transport, food, energy, machine tool, electronic, electrical engineering, and appliance manufacturing industries converted to metric.
1987 – the property industry, the last major industry holdout, converted to metric.
1988 – with Western Australia fully implementing the change, metrication was completed nationwide and the metric system became the only system of legal measurements in Australia.

Metric Conversion Board
Opposition to metrication was not widespread. The Metric Conversion Board did not proceed with education programs as polling revealed that most people were learning units and their application independently of each other, rendering efforts to teach the systematic nature of the metric system unnecessary and possibly increasing the amount of opposition. The Board was dissolved in 1981, but the conversion to the metric system was not completed until 1988. The Board spent A$5.955 million during its 11 years of operation, and the federal government distributed $10 million to the states to support their conversion process. Between 1984 and 1988, the conversion was the responsibility of the National Standards Commission, later renamed the National Measurement Institute in 1988. The cost of metrication for the private sector was not determined but the Prices Justification Tribunal reported that metrication was not used to justify price increases.

Metrication of horse racing
An early change was the metrication of horse racing. This was facilitated because the furlong (one eighth of a mile) is close to 200 m. Therefore, the Melbourne Cup was changed from 2 mi to 3,200 m, a reduction of 19 m or about 0.6%. The first metric Melbourne Cup was raced in November 1972.

Metrication of weather reporting and forecasts
When the Australian Bureau of Meteorology was enlisted to introduce the metric system for weather reporting and forecasts, its public relations officer, Godfrey Wiseman, coined a series of jingles to educate the public, using the terms "frosty fives", "tingling tens", "temperate twenties", "thirsty thirties" and "fiery forties" to describe human sensation to temperatures in degrees Celsius. This was very successful because the public soon became aware of the significance of the descriptions.

At the culmination of this campaign, weather reports and forecasts in both Fahrenheit and Celsius were provided for one month only. After that, from 1 September 1972, only Celsius measurements were given for temperature.

Similarly, wind speed was reported only in kilometres per hour (km/h) from 1 April 1973 and rainfall was reported in millimetres - with river depths, snow depths and waves reported in metres - from 1 January 1974.

Metrication of the road signs
An important and very visible sign of metric conversion in Australia was the change in road signs and the accompanying traffic regulations; "M-day" for this change was 1 July 1974. Because of careful planning, almost every road sign in Australia was converted within a month. This was achieved by installing covered metric signs alongside the imperial signs before the change and then removing the imperial sign and uncovering the metric sign during the month of conversion.

While road signs could not all be changed at the same time, there was little chance of confusion as to what any speed limit sign meant during this short change-over period. This was because the previous mph signs had the signage in black on white and were rectangular, in the same style as current US speed limit signs, whilst the km/h signs which replaced them had the number indicating the speed limit inside a red circle, as is done in Europe.

Road distance signs were also converted during this period. To avoid confusion as to whether the distance indicated was in miles or kilometres new major distance signs had affixed to them a temporary yellow plate showing the symbol km. On the many new kilometre signs on minor roads, a yellow plate which showed the corresponding number of miles was affixed under the now permanent kilometre distance indication. These temporary plates were removed after about one year.

Except for bridge-clearance and flood-depth signs, dual marking was avoided. Though people opposed to metrication expressed concern that ignorance of the meaning of metric speeds would lead to accidents on the roads, this did not happen, as most drivers under the age of 25 had been taught metric units at school and through them, their parents were familiar with metric speeds, if not metric units as a whole.

It was believed that public education would be the most effective way of ensuring public safety. A Panel for Publicity on Road Travel, made up of the various motoring organisations, regulatory authorities and the media, planned a campaign to publicise the change. The resulting publicity campaign cost $200,000 and the Australian Government Department of Transport paid for it. The Board also produced 2.5 million copies of a pamphlet, "Motoring Goes Metric". This was distributed through post offices, police stations and motor registry offices.

"For about a year before the change, motor car manufacturers fitted dual speedometers to their vehicles and, after 1974, all new cars were fitted with metric-only speedometers. Several kinds of speedometer conversion kits were available.

"As a result of all these changes, conversion on the roads occurred without incident."

Building and construction
The building industry was the first major industry grouping in Australia to complete its change to metric. This was achieved within two years by January 1976 for all new buildings other than those for which design had commenced well before metrication began. The resulting savings for builders and their sub-contractors has been estimated at 10% a year of gross turnover.

In this, the industry was grateful to Standards Australia for the early production of the Standard AS 1155-1974 "Metric Units for Use in the Construction Industry", which specified the use of millimetres as the small unit for the metrication upgrade.
In the adoption of the millimetre as the "small" unit of length for metrication (instead of the centimetre) the Metric Conversion Board leaned heavily on experience in the United Kingdom and within the International Organisation for Standardisation, where this decision had already been taken.

This was formally stated as follows:
"The metric units for linear measurement in building and construction will be the metre (m) and the millimetre (mm), with the kilometre (km) being used where required. This will apply to all sectors of the industry, and the centimetre (cm) shall not be used. … the centimetre should not be used in any calculation and it should never be written down".

The logic of using the millimetre in this context was that the metric system had been so designed that there would exist a multiple or submultiple for every use. Decimal fractions would not have to be used. Since the tolerances on building components and building practice would rarely be less than one millimetre, the millimetre became the sub-unit most appropriate to this industry.

Electrical wiring converted from imperial measurements such as 1/044, 1/064, 3/036, 7/029 or 7/036 to metric 1.5mm, 2.5mm or 4.0mm cable diameters.

Extent
Metrication is mostly complete. Road signs solely use metric measurements, as do the speedometers and odometers in motor vehicles produced after 1974. However, there was no requirement for pre-1974 vehicles to have their speedometers and odometers converted to metric, so vintage cars display miles and miles per hour, and privately imported vehicles, such as classic cars, do not need to be converted. Oil and petrol is sold in litres, but tyre pressure is commonly referred to in pounds per square inch alongside kilopascals.

Fruit and vegetables are advertised, sold and weighed in grams, groceries are packed and labelled in metric units. Schooling is wholly metric. Newspaper reports are nearly always in metric. In some cases, old imperial standards were replaced with rounded metric values, as with horse racing or the size of beer glasses (rounded to the nearest 5 cm3). The pre-metric names of beer glass sizes, including the pint, have been retained (although in South Australia the "pint" of beer is not an imperial pint, as it is elsewhere in Australia). Dressed timber is often sold in lengths such as 1.8, 2.4, 3.0, and 3.6 metres, each multiples of 300 mm, approximating foot length increments, while pipes and conduits may be specified as having diameters of 12, 19, 25, and 32 mm (based on "soft" conversions of 0.5, 0.75, 1 and 1.25 in).

In some cases, goods manufactured to pre-metric standards are available, such as some bolts, nuts, screws and pipe threads and there are some instances where imperial units may still be used:
 
Mass is referred to in grams, and baby nappy sizes are specified in grams only. A few parents still convert their baby's hospital-stated birth mass to pounds and ounces.
Human height is measured in centimetres. In informal contexts, a person's height may be stated in feet and inches.
Domestic and commercial property is advertised in square metres or hectares. Although crop yields are described in tonnes per hectare, rural land area is occasionally reported in acres. 
Weather reports are measured in metric but occasionally refer to some wave heights in feet.

Whilst imperial units may sometimes be specified instead of SI units (usually, where the product originates from or is intended for an American market), the use of any measurement except in SI units is not "legal for trade" under Australian legislation.

Examples where non-SI units are (sometimes) specified are:

Aviation, as in many other metric countries, specifies horizontal distances in nautical miles and horizontal speed in knots, but horizontal distance for visibility or clearance from clouds is in kilometres or metres, as are runway dimensions. The pressure and temperature are also given in SI, with hectopascals and degrees Celsius respectively. Altitude and ascent/descent is given in feet and feet per minute.
Altitude for sky diving is routinely given in feet, which follows from the above existing aviation conventions. Scuba diving uses metric units.
Australia uses metric paper sizes for office use and home printing. (A4=210×297 mm) However, the term dots per inch (dpi) is still used when printing images. The photo printing industry uses both imperial and metric sizes for photograph dimensions (e.g. 4×6in as well as 10×15 cm).
Historical writing and presentations may include pre-metric units to reflect the context of the era represented.
Vehicle tyres (as in the rest of the world) mark the rim diameter in inches and the width in millimetres. A car tyre marked '165/70R13' has a width of 165 mm, an aspect ratio (profile) of 70% and a 13-inch rim diameter. Tyre pressures may be given in both kilopascals and "pounds per square inch".
Display sizes for the screens of TVs and computer monitors may be described as having their diagonals measured in inches instead of or as well as centimetres, e.g., a Plasma screen may be advertised as 42" (1,066.8 mm).
Firearm barrel length is almost always referred to in inches, whereas ammunition is measured in grams.

Cultural influence from the UK and USA has also been cited as a reason for residual use of imperial units.

References

Further reading
 
 

Economic history of Australia
History of Australia (1945–present)
Australia